Pachat-e Charbiyun (also Romanized as Pāchāt-e Charbīyūn; also known as Pāchāt) is a village in Zilayi Rural District, Margown District, Boyer-Ahmad County, Kohgiluyeh and Boyer-Ahmad Province, Iran. At the 2006 census, its population was 26, in 5 families.

References 

Populated places in Boyer-Ahmad County